The Ferris Site is an archaeological site in the southwestern part of the U.S. state of Ohio.

In 1970, University of Cincinnati archaeologists excavated the Ferris Site.  This investigation yielded a significant number of stone tools, such as blanks, blades, and knives.  Synthesis of the artifacts discovered at Ferris has led to the conclusion that it was occupied during the Early Archaic period.  As such, it is a unique site in southern Ohio.  In recognition of its significance, Ferris was listed on the National Register of Historic Places in 1974.  It is one of nine archaeological sites in the county that is listed on the National Register.

References

Archaeological sites on the National Register of Historic Places in Ohio
Archaic period in North America
National Register of Historic Places in Clermont County, Ohio